Charleton is a civil parish in the English county of Devon. In 2001 its population was 511. The parish forms part of the Saltstone electoral ward. At the 2011 census the ward had a population of 1,529.

Forming part of the South Hams district its main settlements are East Charleton (a hamlet) and West Charleton which has the parish church of St Mary's, (the latter being the larger of the two settlements).

References

Civil parishes in South Hams